In statistics, the strictly standardized mean difference (SSMD) is a measure of effect size. It is the mean divided by the standard deviation of a difference between two random values each from one of two groups. It was initially proposed for quality control
and hit selection
in high-throughput screening (HTS) and has become a statistical parameter measuring effect sizes for the comparison of any two groups with random values.

Background
In high-throughput screening (HTS), quality control (QC) is critical. An important QC characteristic in a HTS assay is how much the positive controls, test compounds, and negative controls differ from one another. This QC characteristic can be evaluated using the comparison of two well types in HTS assays. Signal-to-noise ratio (S/N), signal-to-background ratio (S/B), and the Z-factor have been adopted to evaluate the quality of HTS assays through the comparison of two investigated types of wells. However, the S/B does not take into account any information on variability; and the S/N can capture the variability only in one group and hence cannot assess the quality of assay when the two groups have different variabilities.
Zhang JH et al. proposed the Z-factor. The advantage of the Z-factor over the S/N and S/B is that it takes into account the variabilities in both compared groups. As a result, the Z-factor has been broadly used as a QC metric in HTS assays.   The absolute sign in the Z-factor makes it inconvenient to derive its statistical inference mathematically.

To derive a better interpretable parameter for measuring the differentiation between two groups, Zhang XHD
proposed SSMD to evaluate the differentiation between a positive control and a negative control in HTS assays. SSMD has a probabilistic basis due to its strong link with d+-probability (i.e., the probability that the difference between two groups is positive).  To some extent, the d+-probability is equivalent to the well-established probabilistic index P(X > Y) which has been studied and applied in many areas.

  Supported on its probabilistic basis, SSMD has been used for both quality control and hit selection in high-throughput screening.

Concept

Statistical parameter
As a statistical parameter, SSMD (denoted as ) is defined as the ratio of mean to standard deviation of the difference of two random values respectively from two groups. Assume that one group with random values has mean  and variance  and another group has mean  and variance . The covariance between the two groups is   Then, the SSMD for the comparison of these two groups is defined as

If the two groups are independent,

If the two independent groups have equal variances ,

Statistical estimation
In the situation where the two groups are independent, Zhang XHD

derived the maximum-likelihood estimate (MLE) and method-of-moment (MM) estimate of SSMD. Assume that groups 1 and 2 have sample mean ,   and sample variances . The MM estimate of SSMD is then

When the two groups have normal distributions with equal variance,
the uniformly minimal variance unbiased estimate
(UMVUE) of SSMD is,

where  are the sample sizes in the two groups and
.

In the situation where the two groups are correlated, based on a paired difference with a sample size , sample mean  and sample variance , the MM estimate of SSMD is

The UMVUE estimate of SSMD is

SSMD looks similar to t-statistic and Cohen's d, but they are different with one another as illustrated in.

Application in high-throughput screening assays
SSMD is the ratio of mean to the standard deviation of the difference between two groups. When the data is preprocessed using log-transformation as we normally do in HTS experiments, SSMD is the mean of log fold change divided by the standard deviation of log fold change with respect to a negative reference. In other words, SSMD is the average fold change (on the log scale) penalized by the variability of fold change (on the log scale)

. For quality control, one index for the quality of an HTS assay is the magnitude of difference between a positive control and a negative reference in an assay plate. For hit selection, the size of effects of a compound (i.e., a small molecule or an siRNA) is represented by the magnitude of difference between the compound and a negative reference. SSMD directly measures the magnitude of difference between two groups. Therefore, SSMD can be used for both quality control and hit selection in HTS experiments.

Quality control
The number of wells for the positive and negative controls in a plate in the 384-well or 1536-well platform is normally designed to be reasonably large
.
Assume that the positive and negative controls in a plate have sample mean ,  sample variances , and sample sizes . Usually, the assumption that the controls have equal variance in a plate holds. In such a case, The SSMD for assessing quality in that plate is estimated as

where .
When the assumption of equal variance does not hold, the SSMD for assessing quality in that plate is estimated as

If there are clearly outliers in the controls, the SSMD can be estimated as

where  are the medians and median absolute deviations in the positive and negative controls, respectively.

The Z-factor based QC criterion is popularly used in HTS assays. However, it has been demonstrated that this QC criterion is most suitable for an assay with very or extremely strong positive controls.  In an RNAi HTS assay, a strong or moderate positive control is usually more instructive than a very or extremely strong positive control because the effectiveness of this control is more similar to the hits of interest. In addition, the positive controls in the two HTS experiments theoretically have different sizes of effects. Consequently, the QC thresholds for the moderate control should be different from those for the strong control in these two experiments. Furthermore, it is common that two or more positive controls are adopted in a single experiment.  Applying the same Z-factor-based QC criteria to both controls leads to inconsistent results as illustrated in the literatures.

The SSMD-based QC criteria listed in the following table take into account the effect size of a positive control in an HTS assay where the positive control (such as an inhibition control) theoretically has values less than the negative reference.

In application, if the effect size of a positive control is known biologically, adopt the corresponding criterion based on this table. Otherwise, the following strategy should help to determine which QC criterion should be applied: (i) in many small molecule HTS assay with one positive control, usually criterion D (and occasionally criterion C) should be adopted because this control usually has very or extremely strong effects; (ii) for RNAi HTS assays in which cell viability is the measured response, criterion D should be adopted for the controls without cells (namely, the wells with no cells added) or background controls; (iii) in a viral assay in which the amount of viruses in host cells is the interest, criterion C is usually used, and criterion D is occasionally used for the positive control consisting of siRNA from the virus.

Similar SSMD-based QC criteria can be constructed for an HTS assay where the positive control (such as an activation control) theoretically has values greater than the negative reference. More details about how to apply SSMD-based QC criteria in HTS experiments can be found in a book.

Hit selection
In an HTS assay, one primary goal is to select compounds with a desired size of inhibition or activation effect. The size of the compound effect is represented by the magnitude of difference between a test compound and a negative reference group with no specific inhibition/activation effects. A compound with a desired size of effects in an HTS screen is called a hit. The process of selecting hits is called hit selection. There are two main strategies of selecting hits with large effects.  One is to use certain metric(s) to rank and/or classify the compounds by their effects and then to select the largest number of potent compounds that is practical for validation assays.

The other strategy is to test whether a compound has effects strong enough to reach a pre-set level. In this strategy, false-negative rates (FNRs) and/or false-positive rates (FPRs) must be controlled.

SSMD can not only rank the size of effects but also classify effects as shown in the following table based on the population value of SSMD.

The estimation of SSMD for screens without replicates differs from that for screens with replicates.

where .
When there are outliers in an assay which is usually common in HTS experiments, a robust version of SSMD  can be obtained using

In a confirmatory or primary screen with replicates, for the i-th test compound with  replicates, we calculate the paired difference between the measured value (usually on the log scale) of the compound and the median value of a negative control in a plate, then obtain the mean  and variance  of the paired difference across replicates. The SSMD for this compound is estimated as

In many cases, scientists may use both SSMD and average fold change for hit selection in HTS experiments. The dual-flashlight plot

can display both average fold change and SSMD for all test compounds in an assay and help to integrate both of them to select hits in HTS experiments

. The use of SSMD for hit selection in HTS experiments is illustrated step-by-step in

See also
 Effect size
 high-throughput screening
 Z-factor
 Hit selection
 SMCV
 c+-probability
 Contrast variable
 Dual-flashlight plot

Further reading
 Zhang XHD (2011) "Optimal High-Throughput Screening: Practical Experimental Design and Data Analysis for Genome-scale RNAi Research, Cambridge University Press"

References

Effect size
Descriptive statistics